Hirm (earlier, ;  or Hirin) is a town in the district of Mattersburg in the Austrian state of Burgenland.  It lies on the Hirmer Bach, a tributary of the River Wulka, downstream from Krensdorf.

Population

References

Cities and towns in Mattersburg District